Havir may refer to:
 Havir, Khuzestan (حوير) - Ḩavīr
 Havir, Tehran (هوير) - Havīr